František Michl (20 November 1901, Domažlice – 4 June 1977, Domažlice), Czech academic painter, graphic artist, and original designer of the Škoda Works emblem, the "Winged Arrow". He was imprisoned in Pankrac Prison, and the concentration camps Terezin and Flossenbürg after his arrest by Nazis for an anti-fascist demonstration at Domažlice. After the war he was arrested in the Czechoslovak Socialist Republic for listening to the anticommunist Radio Liberty.

Biography
Michl was born in Domažlice, in a brush maker's family. After receiving a financial award for winning the competition of Škoda Works in Plzeň for a new emblem with his design "The Winged Arrow", young Michl was able to study at the Academy of Fine Arts in Prague, to build his own painting studio in Domažlice, and to travel. He studied at the Academy of Fine Arts in Prague between 1925 and 1928, with Otakar Nejedly. Between 1922 and 1935, he undertook a series of study trips, especially to France, Germany, Dalmatia, Greece, Italy, North Africa, Corsica, Dresden, the Netherlands, the Alps, Styria and Bulgaria.

In 1927, he became a member of several Czech artists' associations. He received three awards from the Czech Academy of Sciences and Arts for his contribution to Czech culture.

Michl was, among others, an organizer of the famous pilgrimage to St. Lawrence at Domažlice on 13 August 1939. This event became the largest anti-fascist demonstration during the World War II period. This was also one of the reasons for his arrest by Nazis and imprisonment in Pankrac Prison, followed by concentration camps in Terezin and Flossenbürg during 1940-41 and 1943–45.

After the end of the war, Michl became a cultural patron in the Domazlice district, and he was also asked to become a professor at the Academy of Arts in Prague; however, he did not accept the offer. In 1958, three of his paintings represented Czechoslovak art at the World Exhibition in Brussels.

Michl, being a free-minded and anticommunist spirit, was imprisoned in Plzeň Prison in 1961. The trial was based on the accusation that Michl listened to Radio Liberty, which was considered by the totalitarian regime as treason. His name was blacklisted and his family persecuted.

The diminished political pressure in 1967 opened new prospects for Michl's art in Czechoslovakia and abroad. In March 1968 his paintings were exhibited in Montreal. The Rullos Gallery in New York bought 165 paintings in November 1968. Unfortunately, preparation of Michl's exhibition in the London National Gallery was interrupted by the Soviet invasion in August 1968.

The time of normalization brought back the ban on Michl's name. Michl was not allowed to publicly display his art (though several illegal exhibitions, organized by his friends, took place, camouflaged under fake titles, for example "Successes of building socialism"). After his first brain stroke in 1972, which left half of his body paralyzed, Michl kept painting. It was only after his sixth stroke that Michl remained permanently bedridden until his death on 4 June 1977.

In 1991, František Michl's name was fully politically rehabilitated, and his contribution to the anti-fascist and anticommunist resistance was recognized. Michl's work, however, is still awaiting public recognition.

Gallery

References

Bibliography
 Prokop Toman: Nový slovník československých výtvarných umělců, Praha 1936
 Čeští malíři na Korsice ("Napsal účastník.") in: Český svět XXIV, č. 29, s. 4-16
 Ladislav Stehlík: Země zamyšlená, 1–3. díl, Praha 1947-1970
 Jindřich Čadík: Špachtle a paleta úsměvná. Hrst veselých chvilek mezi umělci, Plzeň 1966
 Václav Hejný: Přátelé nejstaršího malíře Chodska, Klatovský deník 20. listopadu 1967, s. 9-10
 [Jan P. Holý]: Autor emblému, Domažlický zpravodaj 1987
 KZ Flossenbürg. Das vergessene Konzentrationslager (kol. aut.), Regensburg 1996
 [Jiří Michl]: František Michl 1907–1977 (doprovodný text k výstavě v Plzni roku 1996)
 Hans Simon-Pelanda (ed.): Erinnerung. Eine Ausstellung: Kunst KZ Flossenbürg, Regensburg 1996
 Kateřina Malá: S Chodskem v srdci. Akademický malíř František Michl, sem. práce, Domažlice 2002

Sources
State Archives in Plzeň. Collection Michl František, akademický malíř.

External links
František Michl (1901-1977) webpage
Skoda Company Logo
Flossenbürg Concentration Camp
KZ Flossenbürg
Terezín Memorial
The Academy of Fine Arts in Prague 

Academy of Fine Arts, Prague
People from Domažlice
Theresienstadt Ghetto
Landscape painters
1901 births
1977 deaths
Czech printmakers
Czech painters
Czech male painters